Matthew Sussman, also known as Nathan Price, is an American actor, photographer and documentary filmmaker.

Early life
Sussman graduated from Brown University and was trained at the Yale School of Drama.

Career
Sussman has appeared in numerous films, including Kate & Leopold and Pollock, in which he played the artist Reuben Kadish.  Sussman also appeared in three episodes of The Sopranos in 2000 and 2002 as Dr. Douglas Schreck. Other films include John Turturro's Mac and Illuminata. His television work includes appearances in Sex and the City, Law & Order, and the short-lived Peter Berg series Wonderland.

On the New York stage Sussman appeared in MCC Theater's premiere of Tim Blake Nelson's The Grey Zone, directed by Doug Hughes. He was also a member of the original Broadway company of Angels in America, and the U.S. premiere of Shopping and Fucking with Philip Seymour Hoffman and Justin Theroux.  He also had major roles at the Seattle Repertory Theatre, Portland Stage, and Steppenwolf Theater in Chicago.

He worked as a voice actor on many anime dubs, primarily for 4Kids Entertainment. He voiced Gravos and King Moros in Slayers Next.

In 2001, Sussman began working on a series of documentaries for a variety of international television production companies. In 2007, he directed the documentary feature film Who is Norman Lloyd, which premiered at the 2007 Telluride Film Festival followed by a run at New York's Film Forum. He was the associate producer and narrator of World Wedding, on TLC and Discovery International.

As a photographer Sussman focuses on commercial work, portraits, celebrities, and music. 

While continuing his photography freelance work, Sussman was until recently also the Senior Director, Digital Presence, at The New School in New York working in Marketing and Communication.

Filmography

Film
Men of Respect (1990) - Gunman
Brain Donors (1992) - Cop
Mac (1992) - Clarence
Insomnia (1994) -
States of Control (1997) - Darcy's Husband
The Peacemaker (1997) - National Guard Captain
Illuminata (1998) - Piero
Pollock (2000) - Reuben Kadish
Just Visiting (2001) - Chic Salesnan
Kate & Leopold (2001) - Ad Executive Phil
13 Moons (2002) - Doctor Monroe

Television
Law & Order (1993–2001) - Dr. Jerome Raleigh, Attorney, Alan Fischer
New York News (1995) - Todd
New York Undercover (1996) - Larry Rabinowitz
The Irresponsible Captain Tylor (1993) - Wang (voice)
The Slayers (1996) - Kanzel, Halcyform, Ashford, King Monos, Additional voices
Pokémon (1998) - Meowth
Harlock Saga (1999) - Yattran (voice)
Sex and the City (1998) - Wall Street Man
Now and Again (2000) - Ross
Wonderland (2000) - Emanuel Treyhill
The Sopranos (2000–2002) - Dr. Schreck
Law & Order: Criminal Intent (2002) - David Cantler
Law & Order: Special Victims Unit (2004) - Lawrence Alcott

References

External links
 

American filmmakers
Living people
American male voice actors
Male actors from New York City
Brown University alumni
American photographers
Year of birth missing (living people)